The FQN–FCN Union is the official representative organization for Canada in the International Naturist Federation (INF).  It was created by the French-language Fédération Québécoise de Naturisme (FQN) and the English-language Federation of Canadian Naturists (FCN)  because the international body recognizes only one naturist organization per country.

History
As the Eastern Canadian Sunbathing Association (ECSA), also known as the Canadian Nudist Confederation (CNC), was failing in late 1970's, the Fédération Québécoise de Naturisme was formed in 1977 but only to represent the province of Québec. But due to the lack of any other Canadian organization, they were recognized by the International Naturist Federation as the official representative for the country. This caused a problem when the Federation of Canadian Naturists was formed in 1986 to represent English-speaking Canada because the International Naturist Federation statutes only allow it to recognize one organization per country. To resolve this conflict, the FQN-FCN Union was formed and it replaced the FQN as the official Canadian representative.

See also
naturism
List of social nudity organizations

References

External links 

 Official site

Clothing free organizations
Naturism in Canada